AT1 may refer to:

 Angiotensin II receptor type 1
 Additional Tier 1 capital, see Contingent convertible bond
 Yamaha AT1 (1969-1971) motorcycle
 Ekspress AT1, communications satellite AT1 in the Ekspress network
 AeroTech Release 1; tabletop wargame

See also

 Angiotensin II receptor blocker (AT1 blocker)
 
 
 ATL (disambiguation)
 ATI (disambiguation)
 AT (disambiguation)